The Kingdom of Redonda is the name for the micronation associated with the tiny uninhabited Caribbean island of Redonda.

The island lies between the islands of Nevis and Montserrat, within the inner arc of the Leeward Islands chain, in the West Indies. Redonda is legally a  dependency of the country of Antigua and Barbuda.

The island teems with bird life, but is more or less uninhabitable by humans because there is no source of freshwater other than rain, and most of the island is extremely steep and rocky, with only a relatively small, sloping plateau area of grassland at the summit. Landing on the island is a very challenging process, possible only via the leeward coast on days when the seas are calm. Climbing to the top of the island is also very arduous.

Despite these difficulties, from 1865 until 1912 Redonda was the centre of a lucrative trade in guano mining, and many thousands of tons of phosphates were shipped from Redonda to Britain. The ruins associated with the mineworkings can still be seen on the island.

Redonda also is a micronation which may, arguably and briefly, have existed as an independent kingdom during the 19th century, according to an account told by the fantasy writer M. P. Shiel. The title to the supposed kingdom is still contested to this day in a half-serious fashion. The "Kingdom" is also often associated with a number of supposedly aristocratic members, whose titles are awarded by whoever is currently the "King". Currently there are a number of individuals in different countries who claim to be the sole legitimate "King" of Redonda.

History
The history of the "Kingdom" of Redonda is shrouded in doubt and legend, and it is difficult to separate fact from fiction.

During Shiel's lifetime
M. P. Shiel (1865–1947), an author of works of adventure and fantasy fiction, was the first person to give an account of the "Kingdom of Redonda," in 1929, in a promotional pamphlet for a reissue of his books.

According to tradition, Shiel's father, Matthew Dowdy Shiell, who was a trader and Methodist lay preacher from the nearby island of Montserrat, claimed the island of Redonda when his son, Matthew Phipps Shiell, was born. Supposedly the father felt he could legitimately do this, because it appeared to be the case that no country had officially claimed the islet as territory. Shiell senior is also said to have requested the title of King of Redonda from Queen Victoria and according to the legend, it was granted to him by the British Colonial Office rather than by Victoria herself, provided there was no revolt against colonial power.

The son (originally named Matthew Phipps Shiell but later known as the writer M. P. Shiel) claimed he was crowned on Redonda at the age of 15, in 1880, by a bishop from Antigua. However, as M. P. Shiel's recounting of this story never saw print until 1929, it is possible that some, or most, or possibly all of the story of his being crowned King of Redonda may in fact be pure invention.

In his writings about Redonda, however, Shiel is critical of the egotism that led him to accept the title, suggesting that there may have been some truth behind the story of the coronation. Shiel does however cite two different names for the bishop who performed the coronation: the Reverend Dr Mitchinson and the Rev. Hugh Semper.  These men were both genuine clerics in the Caribbean during this period. The contradiction could of course be explained as due to Shiel's faulty memory rather than the story being based on total invention. In “About Myself” Shiel writes that his attempt to impose a tribute tax on the American guano miners was a request they refused. This early non-recognition of his kingship is another possible argument that the coronation actually occurred.

Several of Shiel's works of fiction concerned various aspects of monarchy. One of his detective heroes is called Cummings King Monk. In Shiel's 1901 end-of-the-world story The Purple Cloud, the protagonist Adam Jeffson, the last man on earth, establishes himself as monarch of the devastated globe, while Shiel's novel The Lord of the Sea (1901) has Richard Hogarth, another Overman figure, coming to dominate the world. In 1899, Shiel wrote about visiting Redonda in his adventure novel Contraband of War.

In later life, Shiel gave the title, and the rights to his work, to his chief admirer, London poet and editor John Gawsworth (Terence Ian Fytton Armstrong), the biographer of Arthur Machen, who was the realm's Archduke. Gawsworth (1912–70) seems to have passed on the title several times when the writer was low in funds.  Gawsworth's realm has been facetiously termed "Almadonda" (by the Shielian scholar A. Reynolds Morse (1914-2000)) after the Alma pub in Westbourne Grove, Bayswater, London, where "King Juan" frequently held court in the 1960s.

After Shiel's death
Gawsworth had also apparently promised to make the first son of his friends Charles and Jean Leggett, Max Juan Tonge Leggett, his Redondan heir if they gave the child (born in the late 1950s), his royal name of Juan.

Some Redondan scholars accept that Gawsworth bestowed the title on his friend the publican Arthur John Roberts in 1967, by "Irrevocable Covenant".  Prior to this the late writer Dominic Behan (1928–89) also claimed Gawsworth transferred the title to him in 1960. It is also said that Gawsworth handed on the throne to one Aleph Kamal, whose peers include the novelist Edna O'Brien.

Self-appointed monarchs of Redonda include Marvin Kitman and William Scott Home. Scott Home's claim to the title was, he says, based on ESP and reincarnation.
 
Publisher, author and environmentalist Jon Wynne-Tyson, however, claims that Gawsworth, prior to dying in 1970, bestowed the kingship on him with the literary executorships, although the writer Iain Fletcher was the joint literary executor for Gawsworth.

Later developments
Jon Wynne-Tyson subsequently visited Redonda in 1979, on an expedition organized by the philanthropist and Shielian publisher A. Reynolds Morse. Wynne-Tyson ruled as King Juan II until abdicating in favour of the novelist Javier Marías of Madrid in 1997, transferring the literary executorship of Gawsworth and Shiel along with the title.

Arthur John Roberts’ title was subsequently inherited by William Leonard Gates, whom Gawsworth had given the title of "Baron L'Angelier de Blythswood de Redonda". From his home at Thurlton, Norfolk, Gates, who was known as King Leo, presided over a group known as "The Redondan Foundation", not be confused with "The Redondan Cultural Foundation" set up by Paul de Fortis (see below). Gates died on 2 January 2019 and his crown passed to Queen Josephine.

As in Gawsworth's reign, meetings of these rival groups have been held at the Fitzroy Tavern in Fitzrovia, central London. King Leo reigned as king for thirty years, since 1989. Williamson, who lived on Antigua until his death in 2009, set himself up as the rival "King Robert the Bald". King Robert the Bald was succeeded in 2009 by yachting writer Michael Howorth.

In 1988, the late London clergyman Paul de Fortis established "The Redondan Cultural Foundation". Because of what he viewed as the inaction of the various rival monarchs, de Fortis promoted a new king, Cedric Boston (born on Montserrat in 1960). Boston claimed the Redondan throne in 1984, winning the allegiance of a number of Gawsworth's peers.

On the question of the Kingdom of Redonda, Wynne-Tyson has written:

A stellar legion of Redondan peers, largely writers, date back to the Shiel and Gawsworth eras. They include Arthur Machen, Oliver Stonor, Edgar Jepson, Thomas Burke, Victor Gollancz, Carl Van Vechten, Arthur Ransome, Lawrence Durrell, Gerald Durrell, G. S. Fraser, Michael Harrison, John Heath-Stubbs, Dylan Thomas, Henry Miller, Julian MacLaren-Ross, Philip Lindsay, Rebecca West, John Waller, August Derleth, Stephen Graham, Dorothy L. Sayers, J. B. Priestley, Eden Phillpotts, Stephen Potter, Martin Secker, Frank Swinnerton, John Wain,and Julia Morton-Marr (IHTEC), Esther Terry Wright and Julian Symons and the British beat poet, Royston Ellis, who was ennobled twice.

Actors ennobled during Gawsworth's reign were Michael Denison, Dulcie Gray, Barry Humphries, Diana Dors, Dirk Bogarde, Mai Zetterling, Vincent Price, Joan Greenwood, and Robert Beatty. Also honoured were broadcasters Libby Purves, Roy Plomley and Alan Coren. King Xavier's peers include Pedro Almodóvar, Francis Ford Coppola, A. S. Byatt, Alice Munro, Umberto Eco, George Steiner, Ray Bradbury, Frank Gehry, J. M. Coetzee, Éric Rohmer, and Philip Pullman. The artist Stephen Chambers was ennobled in 2017.

Wynne-Tyson, Javier Marías, Bob Williamson, William Gates and Cedric Boston were all interviewed in the BBC Radio 4 documentary Redonda: The Island with Too Many Kings, broadcast in May 2007.

Death of Javier Marias 
On September 11th, 2022, Javier Marías died in Madrid, leaving the throne up for grabs.

List of kings

Undisputed

Matthew Dowdy Shiell, 1865–1880
Matthew Phipps Shiell, 1880–1947 (styled as King Felipe I)
John Gawsworth, 1947–1967 or 1970 (styled as King Juan I)

Disputed

Arthur John Roberts, 1967–1989 (styled as King Juan II)
Jon Wynne-Tyson, 1970–1997 (styled as King Juan II)
William Leonard Gates, 1989–2019 (styled as King Leo)
Javier Marías, 1997–2022 (styled as King Xavier)

Others

Bob Williamson, 2000–2009 (styled as King Bob the Bald)
Michael Howorth 2009–     (styled as King Michael the Grey)

In popular culture
In 2007, the Wellington Arms pub in Southampton, England, attempted to declare itself an embassy of Redonda, in order to gain diplomatic immunity from a nationwide ban on smoking in enclosed workplaces, including pubs. This ultimately failed when the Foreign and Commonwealth Office pointed out that His Majesty's Government recognises Redonda only as a dependent territory of Antigua and Barbuda which, accordingly, is not entitled to establish an embassy or high commission in the United Kingdom.

References

Further reading
 BBC News October 2002
 BBC Radio 4 May 2007

External links 
 
 The Redondan Foundation Home Page - The Redondan Foundation - Kingdom of Redonda (Website of William L. Gates, King Leo)
 Redonda Roll of Arms 
 Redonda National Anthem
 The Island-Kingdom of Redonda Geoportal

Micronations
History of Antigua and Barbuda
History of Montserrat
History of British Antigua and Barbuda
States and territories established in 1865
1860s establishments in the Caribbean
1865 establishments in North America
Titles of nobility in the Americas
Monarchies of North America
Micronations in Antigua and Barbuda
Kingdom